Clifford Herschel Moore (1866–1931) was an American Latin scholar.

Moore was born in Sudbury, Massachusetts, and educated at Harvard (A.B., 1889) and in Europe at Munich (Ph.D., 1897). He taught classics in California (1889–92) and Massachusetts, at Phillips Academy in Andover (1892–94).

Moore then taught Latin at the University of Chicago (1894–98), and at Harvard from 1898 onward.  He was a professor at the American School of Classical Studies in Rome, Italy.

Moore edited Frederic de Forest Allen's 1899 edition of Euripides' Medea and his 1902 edition Horace's Odes and Epodes (1902), and wrote the textbooks A First Latin Book (1903) and The Elements of Latin (1906).

External links

 
 

1866 births
1931 deaths
American book editors
American classical scholars
Harvard College alumni
People from Sudbury, Massachusetts
Classical scholars of the University of Chicago
Classical scholars of Harvard University
Scholars of Latin literature